Paul John Teutul (born May 1, 1949) is the founder of Orange County Choppers, a manufacturer of custom motorcycles and the focus of the reality television series American Chopper. Teutul first appeared on the show with his sons Paul Teutul Jr. and Michael Teutul. In 2013, his new show Orange County Choppers premiered on CMT.

Early life
Teutul was born in Yonkers, New York and grew up in Pearl River, New York.

He sailed as a member of the United States Merchant Marine during the Vietnam War.

Career

Teutul originally began with Orange County Ironworks, a fabrication shop now solely owned and managed by son Daniel. He began building custom bikes as a hobby after being inspired by the many custom bikes appearing on the streets and in films. In 1999, he left and founded Orange County Choppers. He hired his son Paul Jr. and began building bikes for sale.

Family
In addition to Paul Jr. and Mikey Teutul, Paul Sr. has two other children: Christin Teutul and Dan Teutul. Dan Teutul took over Orange County Ironworks when his father started building more bikes than buildings. His daughter Christin is a nurse in NYC who works in pediatrics. Paul Sr. has seven grandchildren.

Teutul's regular arguments with his son Paul Jr became a routine occurrence during episodes of American Chopper. These vocal disagreements eventually led to Paul Jr. being fired in April 2009.

Tattoos
A significant part of Teutul's image is his numerous tattoos. He has been known to acquire tattoos from time to time in order to express a feeling or to make a point; for example, when he became frustrated about the location of OCC (in Orange County, New York) being frequently confused with Orange County in California, he obtained a tattoo on his left arm with the designation OCC New York in order to make the distinction clear. This tattoo session was filmed as part of an episode of American Chopper. Another example is the tattoo he received from Ami James, renowned tattoo artist from the shop (and fellow TLC show) Miami Ink, a portrait piece of his pet bullmastiff, Marty, to go along with an earlier portrait of his older bullmastiff, Gus (Gussy) whose full name is August, which was done by another tattoo artist.

See also 
 List of American Chopper episodes
 List of American Chopper: Senior vs. Junior episodes
 List of Orange County Choppers episodes

References

External links

 Orange County Choppers
 

1949 births
American Chopper
American sailors
American television personalities
Living people
Military personnel from New York (state)
Motorcycle builders
Participants in American reality television series
People from Pearl River, New York
People from Yonkers, New York
The Apprentice (franchise) contestants
United States Merchant Mariners